Darboğaz is a belde (town) in Niğde Province, Turkey.

Geography

Darboğaz is a part of Ulukışla district of Niğde Province. The population is 1894 as of  2011

History

There are no written sources of the deep history of the town. But probably the vicinity was inhabited during Byzantine Empire era. The earliest settlers of the town were the members of a Turkmen tribe in the 17th century. According to legend, the tribe leader was playing tar, a musical instrument and the earliest name of the settlement was tarbaz or tar player.  (The legend, if true, may show an Azerbaijani origin of the tribe.) That name may be the source of the modern name which also means "narrow pass". Darboğaz was declared township in 1968.

Economy

The main economic activity is agriculture, especially cherry horticulture. The annual cherry production exceeds . Beekeeping and carpet weaving are other economic activities. Being a mountain town the potential for winter tourism is also promising.

Activities

Darboğaz has plenty of activities for every age group. The younger generations can play football, as well as visit multiple cafés. The older generations can visit the aforementioned cafés and can always take a stroll in the beautiful and scenic nature of Darboğaz.

See also
Karagöl, Toros

References

Populated places in Niğde Province
Towns in Turkey
Ulukışla District